Michael Clarke is an Australian former cricketer and captain of the Australia national cricket team. He scored centuries (100 or more runs in a single innings) in Test matches and One Day International (ODI) matches on 28 and 8 occasions respectively during his international career. He played 115 Tests and 238 ODIs for Australia, scoring 8,643 and 7,981 runs, respectively. Journalist Peter English wrote that "Clarke could do anything with the bat, but he has matured into one of the game's most professional, reliable and focussed players". He was named by Wisden as one of their Cricketers of the Year in 2010.  Cricket Australia awarded him with the Allan Border Medal in 2005, 2009, 2012 and 2013.

Clarke scored a century on his Test debut against India at the M. Chinnaswamy Stadium, Bangalore, in 2004. His highest Test score of 329 not out – the highest individual score in an innings at the Sydney Cricket Ground – came against the same team, during the 2011–12 series. As of 2015, Clarke was the only player to have scored four double centuries (200 or more runs) during a calendar year, and the third to achieve two double centuries in a series twice. He has scored Test centuries at sixteen cricket grounds, including eleven at venues outside Australia.  He is fifth in the list of Test century-makers for Australia, only bettered by Ricky Ponting, Steve Waugh, Matthew Hayden and 
Don Bradman.

Having made his ODI debut in 2003 against England at Adelaide Oval, Clarke's first century came against Zimbabwe at the Harare Sports Club in May 2004. His highest ODI score was 130 runs against India at the M. Chinnaswamy Stadium, in 2007. Clarke played 34 Twenty20 International (T20I) matches, with a top score of 67, before retiring in January 2011.

Key

Test cricket centuries

One Day International centuries

Notes

References

General

Specific

External links
 
 

Centuries, Clarke
Clarke, Michael